Ei Actor Natte (English: I'm Not An Actor)  is a 2019 romantic Indian Meitei language film directed by Homen D' Wai and produced by Rodhika Heingang. It stars Shilheiba Ningthoujam and Biju Ningombam in the lead roles. The movie won the Best Popular Film Providing Wholesome Entertainment and Special Jury Mention Awards at the 13th Manipur State Film Awards 2020. It also won two awards at the 9th MANIFA 2020.

Ei Actor Natte was released at Bhagyachandra Open Air Theatre (BOAT), Palace Compound, Imphal on 25 October 2019. The DVDs of the movie were released by MFDC in November 2021.

Synopsis
It is a movie that sketches the unique story of Mani and Rashihenbi. Rashihenbi is an adopted daughter of Pamheiba. She is despised by his wife, Mani's mother. Rashihenbi is compelled to leave her home after her foster mother plots against her. Mani becomes a lunatic to win Rashihenbi back.

Cast
 Shilheiba Ningthoujam as Mani
 Biju Ningombam as Rashihenbi
 Ningthouja Jayvidya as Pamheiba, Mani's father
 Ningthoujam Rina as Mani's mother
 Kripalaxmi Gurumayum as Tampha
 Heisnam Geeta as Sakhenbi, Tampha's mother
 Master Changkhomba as Master Mani
 Baby Ghanaluxmi as Baby Rashihenbi
 Denny Likmabam as Dr. Thanil
 Y. Kumarjit as Khuraton, Rashihenbi's uncle
 Poison (Kh. Debabrata) as Ibemhal
 Surjit Saikhom
 Ibomcha
 Dara
 Bhumeshor
 Jugindro

Accolades
Ei Actor Natte won two awards out of the 12 nominations at the 9th MANIFA 2020 organised by Sahitya Seva Samiti, Kakching. It won the Best Popular Film Providing Wholesome Entertainment and Special Jury Mention Awards at the 13th Manipur State Film Awards 2020.

Music
Tony Aheibam composed the soundtrack for the film and Homen D' Wai wrote the lyrics. The songs are titled Foreign Car and Phajare Ningthire.

References

2019 films
2010s Meitei-language films
2019 romance films
Indian romance films